In January and February 2010, 10 churches were burned in East Texas.

Two local men, Jason Bourque and Daniel McAllister, were arrested, pleaded guilty and were jailed indefinitely.

Timeline
 January 1 – Little Hope Baptist Church, Canton – ruled accident until investigation, later ruled arson
January 1 – Faith Church, Athens – ruled arson 
 January 12 – Lake Athens Baptist Church – burned
 January 12 – Grace Community Church, Athens – burned
 January 16 – Tyland Baptist Church in Tyler – torched
 January 17 – First Church of Christ, Scientist in Tyler – burned to the ground
 January 20 – Prairie Creek Fellowship of Lindale on Highway 69 – arson
 February 4 – Russell Memorial United Methodist Church in Wills Point (Van Zandt County) – destroyed the sanctuary (ATF soon confirmed the fire was the result of arson)
 8:30 PM on February 8 – Dover Baptist Church on Highway 110 outside Lindale – mostly destroyed
 9:30 on February 8 – Clear Spring Missionary Baptist Church, on CR 426 near the Smith-Van Zandt county line – found burning

Suspects

A sketch was released of three persons of interest.

On February 21, 2010, Jason Robert Bourque, 19, of Lindale, and Daniel George McAllister, 21, of Ben Wheeler were charged in connection with the Dover Baptist Church burning that occurred on February 8. Their bond was set at $10 million. As they targeted places of worship, the crime is a first-degree felony carrying a maximum penalty of 99 years to life.

Bourque was raised by his devout Christian maternal grandparents, while McAllister was homeschooled for religious reasons. Per The New York Times both men started to question their faith. Bourque's is attributed to his dropping-out from the University of Texas, and McAllister's after the death of his mother and trouble finding work.

Faced with large amounts of evidence, both men pleaded guilty. On January 14, 2011, Judge Christi Kennedy sentenced Bourque to life and 20 years in prison, and McAllister to a life sentence.

On February 11, 2011, Bourque was interviewed by KLTV 7 from Smith County Jail. He blamed the drug Chantix, which he used to aid his quitting smoking, for psychotic episodes. He also claimed that McAllister had led the wave, targeting churches as he found them corrupt. Bourque stated that God had forgiven him.

Cultural legacy
Theo Love's documentary, Little Hope Was Arson, interviews community members in East Texas reacting to the burning of the 10 churches.

See also
 Church arson

References

2010 fires in the United States
2010 in Texas
Attacks on churches in North America
Anti-Christian sentiment in the United States
Arson in Texas
Attacks in the United States in 2010
January 2010 crimes in the United States
February 2010 crimes in the United States
Van Zandt County, Texas
Henderson County, Texas
Tyler, Texas
Smith County, Texas
Attacks on religious buildings and structures in the United States